William George Howes (4 December 1879 – 20 February 1946) was a New Zealand entomologist and businessman.

Early life
Howes was born in 1879 at Southbridge. He was one of five surviving children of Cecilia Brown and William Howes, a post office clerk and accountant from England. His elder sister Edith, who would become a writer and educationalist, was born in 1872 before the family migrated to New Zealand.

Career
Howes authored scientific papers on entomology, concentrating on New Zealand Lepidoptera, and described numerous species new to science. The species Molophilus howesi was named in his honour.

Howes was a member of a number of organisations including the Royal Entomological Society, Linnean Society of London, American Entomological Society, the Otago Chamber of Commerce, New Zealand Institute, Otago Acclimatisation Society where he sat on the council, and the Dunedin Naturalists Field Club for which he was president for many years. For a quarter of a century, Howes was one of the directors of the Portobello Marine Biological Station.

Due to his acknowledged entomological expertise, Howes was invited to be part of a scientific expedition to the Chatham Islands in 1924.

Howes was involved in the planning, establishment and management of the aquarium at the New Zealand and South Seas International Exhibition in 1925 on Logan Park, Dunedin. When this was unable to be funded by the Acclimatisation Society or the City Corporation, Howes and others registered a private company Aquarium Ltd "to carry on the business of an aquarium at the New Zealand and South Seas Exhibition at Dunedin."

Death
Howes died suddenly on 20 February 1946 at Dunedin where he had lived most of his life. He was buried at Andersons Bay Cemetery. He was survived by his wife Beatrice and four children.

Gallery

References

External links
 Record of William George Howes in Collections Online, Museum of New Zealand Te Papa Tongarewa
 Howes W.G. and W.W. Smith, “Notes on Sphaeria larvarum, Westw.,” Entomologist. Vol. 31. 1898: 128–39
 Howes, W. G. "On the occurrence of M. strategica in Invercargill."Transactions of the New Zealand Institute. Vol. 33. 1901.
 Howes, G. Note on the Occurrence of Two Rare and Two Introduced Moths. Transactions and Proceedings of the Royal Society of New Zealand. Volume 38, 1905
 Howes, W. G. "Some new species of Lepidoptera." Transactions and Proceedings of the New Zealand Institute. Vol. 38. 1906.
Howes, George. Further Notes on Lepidoptera. Transactions and Proceedings of the Royal Society of New Zealand. Volume 40, 1907.
 Howes, W. G. "New species of Lepidoptera." Transactions and Proceedings of the New Zealand Institute. Vol. 43. 1910.
 Howes, G. Notes on the Vegetable Caterpillar. Transactions and Proceedings of the Royal Society of New Zealand Volume 43, 1910.
 Howes, W. G. "New species of Lepidoptera, with notes on the larvae and pupae of some New Zealand butterflies." Transactions and Proceedings of the New Zealand Institute. Vol. 44. 1911.
 Howes, W. G. "Notes on the Entomology of Stewart Island." Transactions and Proceedings of the New Zealand Institute. Vol. 46. 1913.
Howes, W. G. Notes on the Life-history of some New Zealand Moths” Transactions and Proceedings of the Royal Society of New Zealand. Vol. 46. 1913.
Howes, W. George. New Lepidoptera. Transactions and Proceedings of the Royal Society of New Zealand. Vol. 46. 1913.
Howes, W.G. New Lepidoptera. Transactions and Proceedings of the Royal Society of New Zealand. Volume 49, 1916.
 Howes, W. George. "New Lepidoptera." Transactions and Proceedings of the Royal Society of New Zealand. Vol. 71. 1942.
 Howes, W. George. "Lepidoptera Collecting at the Homer'." Transactions and Proceedings of the Royal Society of New Zealand. Vol.73. 1943–1944.
Howes, W. George. New Lepidoptera. Transactions and Proceedings of the Royal Society of New Zealand. Volume 75, 1945–46.
 Howes, W. George. "Lepicjoptera Collecting at the Homer, with Descriptions of New Species." Transactions and Proceedings of the Royal Society of New Zealand. Vol. 76, 1946–1947.

1879 births
1946 deaths
New Zealand entomologists
20th-century New Zealand scientists
Burials at Andersons Bay Cemetery
People from Southbridge, New Zealand